Hugh V (1294 – 9 May 1315) was Duke of Burgundy between 1306 and 1315.

Hugh was the eldest son of Duke Robert II of Burgundy and Agnes of France.

Hugh was betrothed to Catherine of Valois in 1302, but the betrothal was broken off 30 September 1312, and he had no known descendants. He was involved in the Crusader movement and was also titular King of Thessalonica, a title he sold in 1313 to his brother Louis in exchange for the latter's rights to Burgundy. He was succeeded by his younger brother Odo IV, Duke of Burgundy.

References

See also 
Dukes of Burgundy family tree

House of Burgundy
Titular Kings of Thessalonica
Dukes of Burgundy
1294 births
1315 deaths

14th-century peers of France